The following outline is provided as an overview of and topical guide to Germany:

Germany – federal parliamentary republic in Western-Central Europe consisting of 16 constituent states, which retain limited sovereignty. Its capital and largest city is Berlin. With more than 80 million inhabitants, it is the most populous member state in the European Union (EU). Germany is a major economic and political power of the European continent and a historic leader in many cultural, theoretical, and technical fields.

After losing World War I, Germany fell under the control of Adolf Hitler, who started World War II. After losing World War II, Germany was divided into East Germany and West Germany, each on opposite sides in the Cold War. In October 1990, after the Cold War ended, the country was reunified under Christian Democratic Union (CDU) chancellor Helmut Kohl. Germany has since grown to become the world's fourth-largest economy by nominal GDP, a financial status which the country has consistently maintained throughout the early 2020s.

General reference 

 Pronunciation: ; German: Deutschland  (officially the Federal Republic of Germany)
 Common English country name: Germany
 Official English country name: The Federal Republic of Germany
 Common endonym(s): Deutschland
 Official endonym(s): Bundesrepublik Deutschland
 Adjectival(s): German 
 Demonym(s): Germans
 Etymology: Name of Germany
 International rankings of Germany
 ISO country codes: DE, DEU, 276
 ISO region codes: See ISO 3166-2:DE
 Internet country code top-level domain: .de

Geography of Germany 

Geography of Germany is bordered to the north by the North Sea, Denmark, and the Baltic Sea; to the east by Poland and the Czech Republic; to the south by Austria and Switzerland; and to the west by France, Luxembourg, Belgium, and the Netherlands.

 Germany is a:
 Country
 Developed country
 Sovereign state
 Member State of the European Union
 Location:
 Northern Hemisphere and Eastern Hemisphere
 Eurasia
 Europe
 Central Europe
 Western Europe
 Time in Germany
 Time zones:
 Central European Time (UTC+01), Central European Summer Time (UTC+02)
 Extreme points of Germany (major towns):
 North: Westerland (on the island of Sylt at the Danish border)
 South: Oberstdorf, town at Austria
 East: Goerlitz, town at Poland
 West: Aachen, town at Belgium & the Netherlands
 High: Zugspitze 
 Low:  Neuendorf bei Wilster 
 Coastline:  
 Population of Germany: 82,217,800 people (2007 estimate) – 14th most populous country
 Area of Germany:  – 63rd largest country
 Atlas of Germany
 List of cities and towns in Germany
 Metropolitan regions in Germany
 Regiopolis

Neighbours of Germany 
Land boundaries:

Environment of Germany 

 Climate of Germany
 Green building in Germany
 Renewable energy in Germany
 Geology of Germany
 National parks of Germany
 Protected areas of Germany
 Wildlife of Germany
 Fauna of Germany
 Fish of Germany
 Birds of Germany
 Mammals of Germany
 Zoos in Germany

Geographic features of Germany 
 Glaciers of Germany
 Islands of Germany
 Lakes of Germany
 Mountains of Germany
 Volcanoes in Germany
 Rivers of Germany
 Waterfalls of Germany
 Valleys of Germany
 World Heritage Sites in Germany

Administrative divisions of Germany

States of Germany 

Germany is composed of 16 constituent states, called Bundesländer (plural form; Bundesland singularly; see map on the right).

Further subdivisions 

 Some German states are subdivided into administrative regions, called Regierungsbezirke.
 Germany as a whole is further composed of approx. 400 districts, separated into:
 "Rural" districts (Landkreise or Kreise) and
 "Urban" districts (Kreisfreie Städte or Stadtkreise)
 Cities of Germany
 Municipalities of Germany

Demography of Germany 

Demographics of Germany
With over 82 million inhabitants, it comprises the largest population among the member states of the European Union and is home to the third-highest number of international migrants. See more at Immigration to Germany.

Government and politics of Germany 

 Form of government: federal parliamentary representative democratic republic
 Capital of Germany: Berlin
 Former Capital of West Germany and later seat of government of the reunified Federal Republic: Bonn
 Federal budget of Germany
 Elections in Germany
 Electoral reform in Germany
 Electoral system of Germany
 Far-right politics in Germany
 Federalism in Germany
 Political parties in Germany
 Political scandals of Germany
 Security issues in Germany
 Taxation in Germany
 Feed-in tariffs in Germany

Branches of the government of Germany 

Government of Germany

Executive branch of the government of Germany 
 Head of state: President of Germany
 Head of government: Chancellor of Germany
 Cabinet of Germany

Legislative branch of the government of Germany 

 Parliament of Germany (bicameral)
 Upper house: Bundesrat of Germany
 Lower house: Bundestag

Judicial branch of the government of Germany 

Judiciary of Germany
 Federal Constitutional Court
 Joint Senate of the Supreme Courts of the Federation
 Federal Administrative Court
 Federal Court of Justice
 Federal Fiscal Court
 Federal Labour Court
 Federal Social Court
 Federal Patent Court

Foreign relations of Germany 

Foreign relations of Germany
 List of diplomatic missions in Germany
 List of diplomatic missions of Germany
 Embassy of Germany, Abuja
 Embassy of Germany, Bangkok
 Embassy of Germany, Brasília
 Embassy of Germany, Budapest
 Embassy of Germany, Canberra
 Embassy of Germany, Chișinău
 Embassy of Germany, Kyiv
 Embassy of Germany, London
 Embassy of Germany, Moscow
 Embassy of Germany, Ottawa
 Embassy of Germany, Prague
 Embassy of Germany, Saint Petersburg
 Embassy of Germany, Tel Aviv
 Embassy of Germany, Washington, D.C.
 Embassy of Germany, Wellington
 Embassy of Germany, Windhoek

International organization membership 
The Federal Republic of Germany is a member of:

African Development Bank Group (AfDB) (nonregional member)
Arctic Council (observer)
Asian Development Bank (ADB) (nonregional member)
Australia Group
Bank for International Settlements (BIS)
Black Sea Economic Cooperation Zone (BSEC) (observer)
Caribbean Development Bank (CDB)
Central American Integration System (SICA) (observer)
Confederation of European Paper Industries (CEPI)
Council of Europe (CE)
Council of the Baltic Sea States (CBSS)
Economic and Monetary Union (EMU)
Euro-Atlantic Partnership Council (EAPC)
European Bank for Reconstruction and Development (EBRD)
European Investment Bank (EIB)
European Organization for Nuclear Research (CERN)
European Space Agency (ESA)
 European Union (EU)
Food and Agriculture Organization (FAO)
Group of Six (G6)
Group of Seven (G7)
Group of Eight (G8)
Group of Ten (G10)
Group of Twenty Finance Ministers and Central Bank Governors (G20)
Inter-American Development Bank (IADB)
International Atomic Energy Agency (IAEA)
International Bank for Reconstruction and Development (IBRD)
International Chamber of Commerce (ICC)
International Civil Aviation Organization (ICAO)
International Criminal Court (ICCt)
International Criminal Police Organization (Interpol)
International Development Association (IDA)
International Energy Agency (IEA)
International Federation of Red Cross and Red Crescent Societies (IFRCS)
International Finance Corporation (IFC)
International Fund for Agricultural Development (IFAD)
International Hydrographic Organization (IHO)
International Labour Organization (ILO)
International Maritime Organization (IMO)
International Mobile Satellite Organization (IMSO)
International Monetary Fund (IMF)
International Olympic Committee (IOC)

International Organization for Migration (IOM)
International Organization for Standardization (ISO)
International Red Cross and Red Crescent Movement (ICRM)
International Telecommunication Union (ITU)
International Telecommunications Satellite Organization (ITSO)
International Trade Union Confederation (ITUC)
Inter-Parliamentary Union (IPU)
Multilateral Investment Guarantee Agency (MIGA)
Nonaligned Movement (NAM) (guest)
North Atlantic Treaty Organization (NATO)
Nuclear Energy Agency (NEA)
Nuclear Suppliers Group (NSG)
Organisation for Economic Co-operation and Development (OECD)
Organization for Security and Cooperation in Europe (OSCE)
Organisation for the Prohibition of Chemical Weapons (OPCW)
Organization of American States (OAS) (observer)
Paris Club
Permanent Court of Arbitration (PCA)
Schengen Convention
Southeast European Cooperative Initiative (SECI) (observer)
United Nations (UN)
United Nations Conference on Trade and Development (UNCTAD)
United Nations Educational, Scientific, and Cultural Organization (UNESCO)
United Nations High Commissioner for Refugees (UNHCR)
United Nations Industrial Development Organization (UNIDO)
United Nations Interim Force in Lebanon (UNIFIL)
United Nations Mission in Liberia (UNMIL)
United Nations Mission in the Sudan (UNMIS)
United Nations Observer Mission in Georgia (UNOMIG)
United Nations Relief and Works Agency for Palestine Refugees in the Near East (UNRWA)
Universal Postal Union (UPU)
West African Development Bank (WADB) (nonregional)
Western European Union (WEU)
World Customs Organization (WCO)
World Federation of Trade Unions (WFTU)
World Health Organization (WHO)
World Intellectual Property Organization (WIPO)
World Meteorological Organization (WMO)
World Tourism Organization (UNWTO)
World Trade Organization (WTO)
World Veterans Federation
Zangger Committee (ZC)

Law and order in Germany 

Law of Germany
 Laws in Germany
 Referendums in Germany
 Alcohol laws in Germany
 Capital punishment in Germany
 Censorship in Germany
 Censorship in the Federal Republic of Germany
 Civil procedure code of Germany
 Conscription in Germany
 Constitution of Germany
 Constitutional review in Germany
 Copyright law of Germany
 Driving licence in Germany
 Crime in Germany
 Human trafficking in Germany
 Rape in Germany
 Human rights in Germany
 LGBT rights in Germany
 Same-sex marriage in Germany
 Freedom of religion in Germany
 Law enforcement in Germany
 National law enforcement agencies
 Federal Criminal Police Office (Germany)
 Federal Police (Germany)
 German Federal Coast Guard
 GSG 9
 Regional law enforcement agencies
 Landespolizei – are operated by individual German states and are responsible for the bulk of police work in Germany
 Baden-Württemberg Police
 Bavarian State Police
 Hesse State Police
 North Rhine-Westphalia Police
 Rheinland-Pfalz State Police
 Saarland Police
 Landespolizei forces are divided into the following operational sections:
 Schutzpolizei – ('Schupo') The uniformed police officers who patrol the streets, respond to emergency calls, do traffic policing etc.
Kriminalpolizei – ('Kripo') The plain clothes detective branch of the State police, responsible for investigations. For instance, if a car is broken into, the Schupo will respond, secure the car, notify the owner etc., and then hand the case over to Kripo for investigation.
Einsatzhundertschaften (EHU) / Bereitschaftspolizei (BePo) – Uniformed part of the LaPo that is used when manpower is required, for example during political demonstrations.
Landeskriminalamt (LKA) – The State Investigation Bureau is directly subordinate to the state ministry of the interior, supervises police operations aimed at preventing and investigating criminal offences, and coordinates investigations involving more than one Präsidium.
Wasserschutzpolizei (WSP) – The river police for patrolling rivers, lakes and harbours.
Spezialeinsatzkommando (SEK) – The SWAT teams of the German state police.
Autobahnpolizei – The highway patrol or motorway police in Germany.

Military of Germany 

Military of Germany
 Command
 Commander-in-chief:
 Ministry of Defence of Germany
 Bundeswehr
 Army of Germany: Heer
 Navy of Germany: Marine
 Air force of Germany: Luftwaffe
 Special forces of Germany: Kommando Spezialkräfte
 Military history of Germany
 Military ranks of Germany

Local government in Germany 

Local government in Germany

History of Germany

History of Germany, by period 
 18th-century history of Germany

Years in Germany 
Years in Germany
 1871- 1872- 1873- 1874- 1875- 1876- 1877- 1878- 1879- 1880- 1881- 1882- 1883- 1884- 1885- 1886- 1887- 1888- 1889- 1890- 1891- 1892- 1893- 1894- 1895- 1896- 1897- 1898- 1899- 1900- 1901- 1902- 1903- 1904- 1905- 1906- 1907- 1908- 1909- 1911- 1912- 1913- 1914- 1915- 1916- 1917- 1918- 1919- 1920- 1921- 1922- 1923- 1924- 1925- 1926- 1927- 1928- 1929- 1930- 1931- 1932- 1933- 1934- 1935- 1936- 1937- 1938- 1939- 1940- 1941- 1942- 1943- 1944- 1945- 1946- 1947- 1948- 1949- 1950- 1951- 1952- 1953- 1954- 1955- 1956- 1957- 1958- 1959- 1960- 1961- 1962- 1963- 1964- 1965- 1966- 1967- 1968- 1969- 1970- 1971- 1972- 1973- 1974- 1975- 1976- 1977- 1978- 1979- 1980- 1981- 1982- 1983- 1984- 1985- 1986- 1987- 1988- 1989- 1990- 1991- 1992- 1993- 1994- 1995- 1996- 1997- 1998- 1999- 2000- 2001- 2002- 2003- 2004- 2005- 2006- 2007- 2008- 2009- 2010- 2011- 2012- 2013- 2014- 2015- 2016- 2017- 2018- 2019

History of Germany, by region

History of Germany, by subject 
 List of historic states of Germany
 List of historical political parties in Germany
 Military history of Germany

Culture of Germany 

Culture of Germany
 Architecture of Germany
 Altstadt
 World Heritage Sites in Germany
 Cuisine of Germany
 Beer in Germany
 Cultural icons of Germany
 Festivals in Germany
 German humour
 East German jokes
 Languages of Germany
 Media in Germany
 Newspapers in Germany
 Radio in Germany
 Television in Germany
 Video gaming in Germany
 Museums in Germany
 National symbols of Germany
 Coat of arms of Germany
 Flag of Germany
 National anthem of Germany
 Philosophy in Germany
 Prostitution in Germany
 Public holidays in Germany
 Records of Germany
 Scouting and Guiding in Germany
 World Heritage Sites in Germany

Art in Germany 
 Art in Germany
 Cinema of Germany
 Cuisine of Germany
 Fashion of Germany
 Literature of Germany
 Made in Germany

Music of Germany 

Music of Germany
 List of best-selling albums in Germany
 List of best-selling singles in Germany
 List of German composers
 Jazz in Germany

People of Germany 

 Afghans in Germany
 Ahmadiyya in Germany
 Albanians in Germany
 Americans in Germany
 Arabs in Germany
 Armenians in Germany
 Asians in Germany
 Assyrians/Syriacs in Germany
 Azerbaijanis in Germany
 Brazilians in Germany
 Bulgarians in Germany
 Chinese people in Germany
 Croatians in Germany
 Filipinos in Germany
 Georgians in Germany
 Greeks in Germany
 Hungarians in Germany
 Indians in Germany
 Iranians in Germany
 Iraqis in Germany
 Islamic Community of Germany
 Italians in Germany
 Kurds in Germany
 Lebanese people in Germany
 List of Lebanese people in Germany
 Macedonians in Germany
 Russians in Germany
 Serbs in Germany
 Tjaskers in Germany
 Turks in Germany
 Ukrainians in Germany
 Vietnamese people in Germany
 Yazidis in Germany

Religion and belief systems in Germany 

 Irreligion in Germany
 Religion in Germany
 Freedom of religion in Germany
 Religions in Germany
 Buddhism in Germany
 Christianity in Germany
 Catholicism in Germany
 Protestantism in Germany
 Evangelical Church in Germany
 Hinduism in Germany
 Islam in Germany
 Judaism in Germany
 History of the Jews in Germany
 Sikhism in Germany
 Scientology in Germany

Sports in Germany 

Sports in Germany
 American Football Association of Germany
 Athletics in Germany
 Auto racing in Germany
 Speedway Grand Prix of Germany
 1995 Speedway Grand Prix of Germany
 1996 Speedway Grand Prix of Germany
 1997 Speedway Grand Prix of Germany
 1998 Speedway Grand Prix of Germany
 2001 Speedway Grand Prix of Germany
 2007 Speedway Grand Prix of Germany
 2008 Speedway Grand Prix of Germany
 Basketball in Germany
 National basketball games of Germany
 Bodybuilding in Germany
 Cricket in Germany
 Football in Germany
 Australian rules football in Germany
 Football records in Germany
 Footballer of the Year (Germany)
 Foreign football players in Germany
 List of American football teams in Germany
 List of Germany Davis Cup team representatives
 List of Germany international footballers
 List of Germany international footballers 1908–1942
 List of football clubs in Germany
 List of football clubs in Germany by major honours won
 List of football stadiums in Germany
 Women's football in Germany
 Germany at the Olympics
 German records in athletics
 Ice hockey in Germany
 Roller derby in Germany
 Rugby in Germany
 Rugby league in Germany
 Rugby union in Germany
 List of Germany national rugby union players
 List of Germany national rugby union team results
 List of rugby union clubs in Germany
 Sports broadcasting contracts in Germany

Economy and infrastructure of Germany 

Economy of Germany
Germany was the third largest exporter of goods in 2017. In absolute terms, Germany allocates the second biggest annual budget of development aid in the world,
while its military expenditure ranked sixth. The country has developed a high standard of living and established a comprehensive system of social security.

 Economic rank, by nominal GDP (2007): 4th (fourth)
 Agriculture in Germany
 List of mills in Germany
 Central banks
 Deutsche Bundesbank, Frankfurt
 European Central Bank, Frankfurt
 Communications in Germany
 Internet in Germany
 Television in Germany
 History of television in Germany
 Companies of Germany

Currency of Germany: Euro (see also: Euro topics)
ISO 4217: EUR
 Economic history of Germany
 Mining in Germany
 List of mines in Germany
 Mittelstand
 Stock exchange: Frankfurt Stock Exchange
 Tourism in Germany
 List of spa towns in Germany
 Transport in Germany
 Airports in Germany
 Road system of Germany
 Road signs in Germany
 Highway system of Germany
 Rail transport in Germany
 Rapid transit in Germany
 High-speed rail in Germany
 History of rail transport in Germany
 Water supply and sanitation in Germany
 Wirtschaftswunder

Energy in Germany 

Windkraftanlage bei Breydin OT Trampe, Brandenburg;

Energy in Germany
 Electricity sector in Germany
 Geothermal power in Germany
 List of power stations in Germany
 Energy transition in Germany
 Nuclear power in Germany
 Solar power in Germany
 Wind power in Germany
 List of windmills in Germany

Education in Germany 

Education in Germany
 Academic achievement among different groups in Germany
 Academic grading in Germany
 Academic ranks in Germany
 Science and technology in Germany
 List of German inventors and discoverers
 Universities in Germany
 List of schools in Germany
 Music schools in Germany
 State libraries of Germany
 Student loans in Germany

Health in Germany 

Health in Germany
 Health care in Germany
 Emergency medical services in Germany
 Health care system of the elderly in Germany
 Long-term care insurance in Germany
 Nursing in Germany
 Obesity in Germany

See also

Germany
Index of Germany-related articles
List of international rankings
Member state of the European Union
Member state of the Group of Twenty Finance Ministers and Central Bank Governors
Member state of the North Atlantic Treaty Organization
Member state of the United Nations
Outline of Europe
Outline of geography

References

External links

General
 Deutschland.de — Official German portal
 Germany Tourism
 Information about Germany in English — IamExpat in Germany
 German news and features, Expatica
 DW-WORLD.DE Deutsche Welle — Germany's international broadcaster
 News Portal of the German Embassy to the USA
  

Facts and figures
 CIA statistics
 Facts about Germany — by the German Federal Foreign Office
 Destatis.de — Federal Statistical Office Germany 

Travel
 
 Germany Travel Info — by the German National Tourist Office

Pictures
 Database of travelers' photos sorted by region (fotocommunity)

 
 
Germany